Manoj Kumar Khatoi is an Indian cinematographer from Odisha. He is best known for the films Notebook (2019 film), Jawaani Jaaneman, The Fame Game, Budhia Singh – Born to Run and Mitron.

Early life and career
Manoj Kumar Khatoi was born and raised in Konark, Odisha, India. Post completing his course from Biju Pattanaik Film and Television Institute of Odisha, he started his journey in the dream city Mumbai in the year 2002 and has become the master in his field. His movie Budhia Singh – Born to Run starring Manoj Bajpayee has won National Film Award. He did a movie Notebook in 2019, in which he has been beautifully captured the Kashmir Valley. In 2022, he did a web series The Fame Game on Netflix starring Madhuri Dixit. Manoj has also worked in other popular films like Jawaani Jaaneman, Mitron, B.Tech and Classmates to name a few. His upcoming films are Mismatched (season2) and Sooraj Barjatya's Uunchai.

Selected filmography

As cinematographer

Camera and Electrical Department
Don (2006)
Aaja Nachle (2007)
Taare Zameen Par (2007)
Lahore (2010)
We Are Family (2010)
Miss Lovely (2012)
Talaash: The Answer Lies Within (2012)
Fukrey (2013)
Raees (2017)
CzechMate: In Search of Jiří Menzel (2018)

References

External links
 

Living people

Year of birth missing (living people)
Hindi film cinematographers
Malayalam film cinematographers
Cinematographers from Odisha
Marathi film cinematographers